The Grand River (Fairport Harbor) Light is located in the village of Fairport Harbor, Ohio.  The lighthouse was built in 1871 and has a 60-foot tower with a detached keeper's house.  The light was decommissioned in 1925, replaced by the Fairport Harbor West Breakwater Light.

At one time the Coast guard considered using the keeper's house to house their personnel and demolish the tower but a letter writing campaign by local residents prevented it from happening. In 1945 the Coast Guard turned over ownership of the light to the town.

The tower is open to the public and the keeper's house currently serves as the Fairport Harbor Marine Museum and Lighthouse (the first of its kind in the country), operated by the Fairport Harbor Historical Society.  Visitors can climb the lighthouse for a view of the harbor.  Founded in 1945, the museum features exhibits about the history of the lighthouse and its keepers, a Fresnel lens, lifesaving equipment, life on the Great Lakes, ship models and maritime artifacts.  There is a gift shop.  The former pilothouse from the Great Lakes carrier the Frontenac is attached to the museum's building.  The museum is open seasonally, and is located at 129 Second Street. The lighthouse and museum are said to be haunted. Legend has it that a ghost cat haunts the facility. Volunteers and tourists alike have reported feeling a cat rub against them, although the cat is never seen.

Location
The Grand River (Fairport Harbor) Light is located at the intersection of Second and High Streets in the village of Fairport Harbor.

See also 
 List of maritime museums in the United States

Notes

Sources

Further reading
Harrison, Timothy, The lights and Lost Lights of Fairport Harbor, (October, 2001)   Lighthouse Digest.
 Oleszewski, Wes. Great Lakes Lighthouses, American and Canadian: A Comprehensive Directory/Guide to Great Lakes Lighthouses, (Gwinn, Michigan: Avery Color Studios, Inc., 1998) .
 U.S. Coast Guard. Historically Famous Lighthouses (Washington, D.C.: Government Printing Office, 1957).
 Wright, Larry and Wright, Patricia. Great Lakes Lighthouses Encyclopedia Hardback (Erin: Boston Mills Press, 2006)

External links 

 
Fairport Harbor Marine Museum and Lighthouse
Anderson, Kraig.  Lighthouse Friends

Virtual Fairport Harbor

Lighthouses on the National Register of Historic Places in Ohio
Lighthouse museums in Ohio
Museums in Lake County, Ohio
Lighthouses completed in 1871
National Register of Historic Places in Lake County, Ohio